Pelayo Morilla Cabal (born 12 July 2001) is a Spanish footballer who plays as a right winger for Sporting B.

Club career
Born in Oviedo, Asturias, Morilla was a Sporting de Gijón youth graduate. On 21 September 2017, while still a youth, he signed a professional five-year deal with the club.

Morilla made his senior debut with the reserves on 7 January 2018, coming on as a late substitute in a 5–3 Segunda División B away win against Gernika Club. He made his first-team debut on 18 August, replacing Pablo Pérez in a 1–1 away draw against AD Alcorcón in the Segunda División.

On 14 September 2018, Morilla scored his first goal, netting a free kick for the 2–0 in a 2–1 away win in the season's Copa del Rey against Numancia. On 21 July 2021, after featuring mainly for the B-side, he was loaned to Primera División RFEF side Algeciras CF for the campaign.

References

External links

2001 births
Living people
People from Oviedo
Spanish footballers
Footballers from Asturias
Association football wingers
Segunda División players
Segunda División B players
Sporting de Gijón B players
Sporting de Gijón players
Algeciras CF footballers
Spain youth international footballers